Mike Horner may refer to:

 Mike Horner (actor) (born 1955), American pornographic actor
 Mike Horner (politician) (born 1968), politician in Florida
 Mike Horner, U.S. Air Force officer and candidate in the United States House of Representatives elections in Georgia, 2010
 Michael Horner (sport shooter) (born 1928), Kenyan Olympic shooter
 Michael Horner (author) (born 1990), German author